The Norwegian Chemical Society is a professional society in Norway for chemists. Formed in 1893, its purpose is to "promote the interest and understanding of chemistry and chemical technology".

Chair is Kenneth Ruud, vice chair is Hans Henrik Øvrebø and board members are Øyvind Mikkelsen, Lillian Zernichow and Kari Herder Kaggerud.

References

Chemistry societies
Education in Norway
Scientific organizations established in 1893
1893 establishments in Norway
Scientific organisations based in Norway